Kromy is the name of several inhabited localities in Russia.

Urban localities
Kromy, Oryol Oblast, an urban-type settlement in Kromskoy District of Oryol Oblast

Rural localities
Kromy, Ivanovo Oblast, a selo in Verkhnelandekhovsky District of Ivanovo Oblast
Kromy, Novgorod Oblast, a village in Moykinskoye Settlement of Batetsky District of Novgorod Oblast
Kromy, Omsk Oblast, a selo in Kaskatsky Rural Okrug of Isilkulsky District of Omsk Oblast